These are the official results of the athletics competition at the 2009 Lusophone Games which took place on 12–13 and 19 July 2009 in Lisbon, Portugal. Several athletes, including many medalists were later disqualified for doping.

Men's results

100 meters

Heats – July 12Wind:Heat 1: +2.8 m/s, Heat 2: +2.4 m/s

Final – July 12Wind:+1.7 m/s

200 meters

Heats – July 13Wind:Heat 1: +2.4 m/s, Heat 2: +2.3 m/s

Final – July 13Wind:+2.4 m/s

400 meters
July 12

800 meters
July 12

1500 meters
July 13

5000 meters
July 12

10 kilometers

110 meters hurdles
July 12Wind: +1.7 m/s

400 meters hurdles
July 13

3000 meters steeplechase
July 13

4 x 100 meters relay
July 13

4 x 400 meters relay
July 13

High jump
July 13

Long jump
July 13

Triple jump
July 13

Shot put
July 12

Women's results

100 meters
July 12Wind: +2.0 m/s

200 meters
July 13Wind: +4.0 m/s

400 meters
July 12

800 meters
July 13

1500 meters
July 12

5000 meters
July 13

10 kilometers

100 meters hurdles
July 12Wind: +0.5 m/s

400 meters hurdles
July 13Wind: +0.5 m/s

4 x 100 meters relay
July 13

4 x 400 meters relay
July 13

High jump
July 12

Long jump
July 12

Triple jump
July 13

Shot put
July 13

References

Lusophony Games
2009